Penshurst Park Cricket Ground, also known as the Earl of Leicester's Park, is a cricket ground at Penshurst in Kent. It is one of the oldest cricket venues in England. Part of the Penshurst Place estate, it hosted its first recorded match in 1724.

History
Penshurst Park is known to have been the venue for matches played as early as the 1720s. It is first recorded in 1724 for a match involving a combined Penshurst, Tonbridge & Wadhurst team against Dartford Cricket Club. and then in the 1728 English cricket season when it was used for two matches organised by Kent patron Edwin Stead against teams led by the 2nd Duke of Richmond and Sir William Gage. In 1729, Stead used it as his home venue for another match against Sir William Gage's XI.

A number of matches were played by a Penshurst club in the mid-19th century. The ground is the home of the modern Penshurst Cricket Club.

References

1728 establishments in England
Cricket grounds in Kent
Defunct cricket grounds in England
Defunct sports venues in Kent
English cricket venues in the 18th century
History of Kent
Sports venues completed in 1728
Penshurst